Manhattan Butterfly is a 1935 American crime film directed by Lewis D. Collins and starring Dorothy Granger, William Bakewell and Kenneth Thomson.

Cast
 Dorothy Granger as Nina Malone 
 William Bakewell as Stevens aka Stephen Collier 
 Kenneth Thomson as A Gangster 
 Dorothy Burgess as Another Singer 
 Betty Compson
 Carmelita Geraghty
 Harry Holman
 George Meeker
 Matty Fain
 Alphonse Martell
 Edward Keane
 William Arnold
 Jack Trent

References

Bibliography
 Michael R. Pitts. Poverty Row Studios, 1929–1940: An Illustrated History of 55 Independent Film Companies, with a Filmography for Each. McFarland & Company, 2005.

External links
 

1935 films
1935 crime films
1930s English-language films
American crime films
Films directed by Lewis D. Collins
1930s American films